Zaitseve may refer to the following places in Ukraine:
 Zaitseve, Donetsk Oblast, urban-type settlement in Bakhmut Raion of Donetsk Oblast in Ukraine
 Zaitseve, Luhansk Oblast, village in Troitske Raion (district) in Luhansk Oblast of eastern Ukraine